Anam v. Bush, No. 1:04-cv-01194, is a writ of habeas corpus filed on behalf of a dozen Guantanamo detainees.
The petition was filed before US District Court Judge Henry H. Kennedy on July 14, 2004.  It was one of over 200 habeas corpus petitions filed on behalf of detainees held in the Guantanamo Bay detention camp in Cuba.

Details of the captives

Military Commissions Act

The Military Commissions Act of 2006 mandated that Guantanamo captives were no longer entitled to access the US civil justice system, so all outstanding habeas corpus petitions were stayed.

Boumediene v. Bush

On June 12, 2008, the United States Supreme Court ruled, in Boumediene v. Bush, that the Military Commissions Act of 2006 could not remove the right for Guantanamo captives to access the US Federal Court system and all previous Guantanamo captives' habeas petitions were eligible to be re-instated.

References

Guantanamo captives' habeas corpus petitions
United States District Court for the District of Columbia cases